Bacteroid may refer to:

 Bacteroides, a genus of Gram-negative, rod-shaped bacteria
 Bacteroid a differentiated symbiotic form of the nitrogen-fixing bacteria Rhizobia